Davıdonu (also, Davidonu) is a village and municipality in the Lerik Rayon of Azerbaijan.  It has a population of 717.  The municipality consists of the villages of Davıdonu, Vamazğon, and Naftonu.

References 

Populated places in Lerik District